Pholiotina rugosa is a common mushroom which is widely distributed and especially common in the Pacific Northwest. It grows in woodchips, flowerbeds and compost. It has been found in Europe, Asia and North America.  It contains the same mycotoxins as the death cap. It is more commonly known as Conocybe filaris as this is the name it is likely to appear under in field guides. However, Conocybe filaris is a junior synonym of Pholiotina rugosa. Pholiotina rugosa has also been placed in the genus Conocybe, but its morphology and a 2013 molecular phylogenetics study place it in the genus Pholiotina.  Pholiotina fimicola, which grows on dung and rich soil in North America, is a possible synonym. Pholiotina arrhenii has also been considered a possible synonym, but a molecular phylogenetics study found it to be a distinct species.

Description
Pholiotina rugosa has a cap which is conical, expanding to flat, usually with an umbo.  It is less than 3 cm across, has a smooth brown top, and the margin is often striate.  The gills are rusty brown, close, and adnexed.  The stalk is 2 mm thick and 1 to 6 cm long, smooth, and brown, with a prominent and movable ring. The spores are rusty brown, and it may be difficult to identify the species without a microscope.

Toxicity
This species is deadly poisonous. They produce alpha-amanitin, a cyclic peptide that is highly toxic to the liver and is responsible for many deaths by poisoning from mushrooms in the genera Amanita and Lepiota. They are sometimes mistaken for Psilocybe due to their similar looking cap.

See also
 List of deadly fungi

References

External links 

 Mykoweb - Conocybe filaris
 Conocybe filaris photos, description and microscopical information but in Spanish
 Conocybe filaris photo
 Mushroom Observer - Conocybe filaris

Bolbitiaceae
Deadly fungi
Fungi described in 1884
Fungi of North America
Fungi of Europe
Fungi of Asia
Taxa named by Charles Horton Peck